Qaleh Sareban (also Romanized as Qal‘eh Sārebān, Qal‘eh Sārbān, and Qal‘eh-ye Sārebān) is a village in Emamzadeh Abdol Aziz Rural District, Jolgeh District, Isfahan County, Isfahan Province, Iran. At the 2006 census, its population was 189, in 39 families.

References 

Populated places in Isfahan County